The New Narmada Bridge (or the 3rd Narmada Bridge) is an extra dosed bridge, constructed at Bharuch, India. The four-lane bridge is a part of larger project involving six laning of a section of NH-8 between Vadodara and Surat. It runs parallel to Sardar Bridge.

The bridge was constructed by Larsen & Toubro and Dywidag Systems International (DSI-Bridgecon). This bridge was inaugurated by Indian Prime Minister Narendra Modi on 7 March 2017.

Even so, the 3rd Narmada Bridge remains the extradosed bridge with the longest spans in India.

See also
 Golden Bridge, completed in 1881
 Silver Jubilee Railway Bridge Bharuch, completed in 1935

References

Bridges in Gujarat
Bridges completed in 2016
Transport in Ankleshwar
Transport in Bharuch
Cable-stayed bridges in India
Bridges over the Narmada River